Robert Alexander McKinnon (April 17, 1895 – October 8, 1949) was a Canadian ice hockey forward who played five seasons in the National Hockey League for the Hamilton Tigers, New York Americans and Chicago Black Hawks between 1924 and 1929. He also played several years of amateur hockey, primarily with the Sudbury Wolves. Prior to turning professional McKinnon served in World War I.

Playing career
After serving his country for two years during World War I, McKinnon joined the Sudbury Wolves of the Northern Ontario Hockey Association, with whom he had played a few games over three seasons prior to his tour with the army. In 1923–24 he joined the Pittsburgh Yellow Jackets of the United States Amateur Hockey Association, and he made his NHL debut in 1924–25 with the Hamilton Tigers. In that season, he scored eight goals with three assists, mostly while playing defence.

The Hamilton franchise moved prior to the 1925–26 season, becoming the New York Americans. McKinnon moved with the team, and played with them for three seasons. He was traded to the Chicago Black Hawks for the 1928–29 season in exchange for Charley McVeigh. He played one season for Chicago, and subsequently retired from playing to become a coach for the Sudbury Wolves.

Career statistics

Regular season and playoffs

References

External links

1895 births
1949 deaths
Canadian ice hockey right wingers
Canadian military personnel of World War I
Chicago Blackhawks players
Hamilton Tigers (ice hockey) players
Ice hockey people from Ontario
New York Americans players
Pittsburgh Yellow Jackets (USAHA) players
Sportspeople from Sault Ste. Marie, Ontario